Neil Jackson (born 5 March 1976) is an English actor, singer, musician and writer who has appeared in several television series and films, but is probably best known for his role as Marcus on Blade: The Series and Sasha on Make It or Break It. 

His screenwriting credits include the film The Passage directed by Mark Heller and released in 2007. He has starred in several other films including Quantum of Solace and Push.

Early life
Jackson was born in Luton, Bedfordshire, the second of four sons of Evelyn and Dennis Jackson.

Jackson began acting when studying drama at GCSE level in Harlington Upper School. While there he was in several school plays including Annie, Little Shop of Horrors, Hard Times, and West Side Story. He also acted in National Youth Theatre as a teenager before moving to Cardiff to study sport at the University of Wales Institute Cardiff (UWIC) in Wales.

In Wales, Jackson started competitive boxing, entering in the British Universities Boxing Championships, an inter-university competition held throughout the whole of Britain, and won the gold at light middleweight. He went on to successfully defend his title two years later at middleweight. His boxing earned him a scholarship to stay on at UWIC, where he earned his master's degree and graduated in 1998.

Career
Not knowing how to get into acting, Jackson wrote a musical and entered it into a national competition for new writers. It came in third and gained attention from producers in London including Michael Armstrong. He later enrolled in Michael Armstrong's Acting Academy, graduating in 2002.

Jackson's first professional acting job was in the UK national touring production of Strindberg's classic Miss Julie. He understudied the lead character, Jean, a role he took over in the West End production later that year. His breakthrough came in 2004 when Oliver Stone cast him as Perdiccas in the Hollywood blockbuster film, Alexander, alongside Colin Farrell and Angelina Jolie. When he met the director, he had a black eye and three stitches in his eyebrow, a fact he jokes must have assisted him as Stone cast him for the role on the spot. He was also in the British football drama Dream Team for a season as lottery winning chairman Phil Wallis.

In 2006, he made a guest appearance on American TV's Cold Case in the season 4 episode "Sandhogs", as "Donny", the victim killed during a cave-in by his brother-in-law. Then The Passage was released in 2007, a film written by Jackson and shot in Morocco, in which he played a lead character alongside Stephen Dorff. It won the 2008 Jury Award at the Durango Film Festival. He made further TV guest appearances: on CSI: Crime Scene Investigation in the season 8 episode "A La cart"; as "Ian" on How I Met Your Mother; in 2008 on CSI: Miami; and in 2009 as a wraith on Stargate: Atlantis.

In 2008, Jackson filmed scenes on location in Panama for the Bond film Quantum of Solace, where he played the character of Mr. Slate. He previously starred in the ABC Family original series, Make It or Break It as Sasha Belov. Additionally, Jackson has appeared as Lucas Hellinger, a Blackout conspirator, on the ABC show FlashForward. In 2010, he starred as the chauffeur, Harry Spargo, in the BBC revival of Upstairs, Downstairs. Jackson was cast in the lead role of Sir Percy Blakeney/The Scarlet Pimpernel in Fairbanks Productions' adaptation of the classic tale in 2012.

Other interests 
Jackson is patron of UK spinal injuries charity Trust PA, in memory of a friend.

Filmography

Film

Television

References

External links
Official Website

Neil Jackson Discusses Life on the Set of "Alexander" – About.com interview
 Hollywood Reporter – The Scarlet Pimpernel
 The Scarlet Pimpernel announced

English male film actors
English male television actors
1976 births
Living people
Actors from Luton
Male actors from Bedfordshire
National Youth Theatre members